

Champions

Major League Baseball
World Series: Cincinnati Reds over New York Yankees (4-0); Johnny Bench, MVP

All-Star Game, July 13 at Veterans Stadium: National League, 7-1; George Foster, MVP

Other champions
Amateur World Series: Cuba
College World Series: Arizona
Japan Series: Hankyu Braves over Yomiuri Giants (4-3)
Big League World Series: Taipei, Taiwan
Little League World Series: Chofu, Tokyo, Japan
Senior League World Series: Pingtung, Taiwan
Winter Leagues
1976 Caribbean Series: Naranjeros de Hermosillo
Dominican Republic League: Águilas Cibaeñas
Mexican Pacific League: Naranjeros de Hermosillo
Puerto Rican League: Vaqueros de Bayamón
Venezuelan League: Tigres de Aragua

Awards and honors
Baseball Hall of Fame
Oscar Charleston
Roger Connor
Cal Hubbard
Bob Lemon
Freddie Lindstrom
Robin Roberts
Most Valuable Player
Thurman Munson, New York Yankees, C (AL)
Joe Morgan, Cincinnati Reds, 2B (NL)
Cy Young Award
Jim Palmer, Baltimore Orioles (AL)
Randy Jones, San Diego Padres (NL)
Rookie of the Year
Mark Fidrych, Detroit Tigers, P (AL)
Butch Metzger, San Diego Padres, P and Pat Zachry, Cincinnati Reds, P (NL)
Woman Executive of the Year (major or minor league): Alice Neighbors, Tulsa Oilers, American Association

Statistical leaders

Major league baseball final standings

Events

January–March
In January 1976, San Francisco Giants owner Horace Stoneham agreed to sell the team for $13.25 million to a Toronto group consisting of Labatt Brewing Company, Vulcan Assets Ltd., and Canadian Imperial Bank of Commerce. The team would begin play with the 1976 season at Exhibition Stadium and be called the Giants.
January 2 – Pitchers Robin Roberts and Bob Lemon are voted into the Hall of Fame by the Baseball Writers' Association of America.
January 14 – Ted Turner completes the purchase of 100 percent of the Atlanta Braves.
January 27 – The Pittsburgh Pirates sign undrafted free agent Pascual Perez.
February 3 – The Special Veterans Committee selects players Roger Connor and Freddie Lindstrom, and umpire Cal Hubbard, for the Hall of Fame. Hubbard becomes the first man elected to both the Pro Football and Baseball Halls of Fame.
February 9 – Oscar Charleston is selected for the Hall of Fame by the Special Committee on the Negro Leagues.
February 17 – Mike Scott of Pepperdine pitches a perfect game against California Lutheran University. He will be selected in the 2nd round of the June draft.
March 1 – The 1976 Major League Baseball lockout is instated, the second lockout in league history.
March 17 – Major League Baseball's lockout ends as Commissioner of Baseball Bowie Kuhn orders team owners to open spring training camps to their players immediately.
March 20 – Leo Durocher, hired to manage Japan's Yokohama Taiyō Whales of the Central League, is sick with hepatitis and asks for a five-week delay in reporting. Durocher receives a telegram from the Whales stating: "Since the championship starts in 20 days, it's better if you stay home and take care of yourself for the remainder of the season."
March 26 – The American League approves the purchase of the new Toronto franchise by the Labatt Brewing Company for $7 million.

April–June
April 2 – The Oakland Athletics trade prospective free agents Reggie Jackson and Ken Holtzman, together with a minor league pitcher, to the Orioles for outfielder Don Baylor and pitchers Mike Torrez and Paul Mitchell.
April 8 – Joaquin Andujar makes his major league debut for the Houston Astros as a relief pitcher. He'd later become a start and twice in his career win 20 games or more in a season. 
April 9 – In a classic Opening Day pitchers' duel between future Hall of Famers Jim Palmer of the Baltimore Orioles and Ferguson Jenkins of the Boston Red Sox, who would combine for 552 major league wins, Palmer prevails 1–0.
April 10 – The Atlanta Braves sign free agent pitcher Andy Messersmith to a "lifetime contract" worth $1 million.
April 14 – At Wrigley Field, Dave Kingman of the New York Mets launches a home run estimated at 550 feet that plunks a house some 530 feet from home plate, but the Chicago Cubs survive to win 6–5.
April 15 – Newly remodeled Yankee Stadium is jammed with 52,613 fans for Opening Day ceremonies. The 1923 Yankees are honored, and Bob Shawkey, winner of the 1923 Stadium opener, throws out the first ball. The Yankees beat the Minnesota Twins 11–4 on 14 hits, but the only home run is hit by Minnesota's Dan Ford.
April 17 – With the wind blowing out at Wrigley Field, Mike Schmidt leads the Philadelphia Phillies assault with a single, four consecutive home runs, and eight RBI to overcome a 12–1 deficit after three innings and beat the Chicago Cubs in 10 innings, 18–16.  Schmidt becomes the tenth player in Major League history to hit four home runs in a game.
April 21 – At Wrigley Field, Tim Foli of the Montreal Expos hits for the cycle, but it takes him two days to do it. Foli has a single, double and triple against the Cubs, but with the Expos ahead 11–3, the game is suspended on account of darkness. When play resumes the next day, Foli will add a home run in the 8th inning.
April 25:
Chicago Cubs outfielder Rick Monday snatches an American flag from two fans who are about to set it on fire in the outfield during a game at Dodger Stadium. The Dodgers win 5–4 in 10 innings. The next day, the Illinois legislature unanimously approves May 4 as Rick Monday Day.
The Atlanta Braves top the Philadelphia Phillies 3–2, as Darrell Evans draws a walk in his 13th consecutive game to set a new National League record. He'll draw passes in two more games, until April 27, before being shut out. Evans has 19 walks in the 15 games.
May 1 – In the first game of a double-header, Mike Schmidt hits a home run, number 12 for the season.  It was the Phillies 15th game of the season, setting a record for the most homers in a team's first 15 games.
May 15 – Mark Fidrych wins his first major league start, a complete game two-hit 2–1 victory over the Cleveland Indians. Fidrych holds the Indians hitless for six innings, talks to the ball, and tamps down the mound before toeing the rubber each inning.
May 19 – At Detroit, Carl Yastrzemski hits three home runs and goes 4-for-4 as the Boston Red Sox win 9–2 over the host Detroit Tigers. Yesterday, Yaz passed Ted Williams as having played the most games for Boston.
May 20 – At Yankee Stadium, the Boston Red Sox and the New York Yankees are involved in one of the ugliest on-field brawls in sports history. In the bottom of the 6th inning, New York's Lou Piniella crashes into Boston catcher Carlton Fisk in an attempt to score. Fisk and Piniella begin fighting at home plate and the benches clear. During the brawl, Bill Lee is thrown to the ground. As the fight appears to be subsiding, Yankee 3rd baseman Graig Nettles punches Lee after the two exchange words, re-igniting the brawl. Lee suffers a separated shoulder from the tilt and subsequently misses a significant portion of the 1976 baseball season. He kept pitching until 1982, but he was never the same pitcher after the brawl. The Red Sox won the game 8-2.
May 24 – Bert Campaneris of the Oakland Athletics steals five bases in a 12-7 win over the Minnesota Twins.
May 29 – The only home run hit by pitcher Joe Niekro in his 22-year career comes at the expense of brother Phil Niekro as the Houston Astros tie the Atlanta Braves in the seventh inning, then win 4–3.
June 3 – The Boston Red Sox trade outfielder Bernie Carbo, who months earlier had been a star for the team in the 1975 World Series, to the Milwaukee brewers for two journeymen pitchers, Bobby Darwin and Tom Murphy. 
June 4 – Tom Seaver and the New York Mets defeat the Dodgers 11-0 in Los Angeles on a three home run performance by Dave Kingman. Kingman also set a Met record with 8 RBIs in a single game.
June 15 – The Houston Astros are "rained out" of their scheduled home game against the Pittsburgh Pirates at the Astrodome. Massive flooding in the Houston area prevents the umpires and all but a few fans from reaching the stadium. Despite both teams having taken pre-game practice, the absence of the umpiring crew forces the game to be called off.
June 22 – Randy Jones pitches the San Diego Padres to a 4–2 win over the San Francisco Giants, and ties Christy Mathewson's 63-year-old National League record by going 68 innings without a base on balls. Jones receives a standing ovation from the home crowd after striking out Darrell Evans to end the seventh inning. His streak ends when he walks Marc Hill leading off the 8th.
June 25 – The Texas Rangers' Toby Harrah becomes the only shortstop in major league history to go through an entire doubleheader without a fielding chance. At bat, Harrah makes up for the inactivity, collecting six hits including a grand slam in the opener, and another home run in game 2. The Rangers beat the Chicago White Sox in the first game 8–4, but lose the nightcap 14–9.
June 28 – With a national television audience looking on, Detroit's Mark Fidrych, known as "the Bird", beats the New York Yankees 5-1 at Tiger Stadium.

Oakland fire sale
Before the June 15, 1976, trading deadline, Charlie Finley contacted the New York Yankees and the Boston Red Sox. He had proposed a trade to the Boston Red Sox that would have involved Joe Rudi, Rollie Fingers, Vida Blue, Gene Tenace and Sal Bando for Fred Lynn, Carlton Fisk and prospects. In trade talks with the Yankees, Finley proposed Vida Blue for Thurman Munson along with either Roy White or Elliott Maddox. Finley also offered Joe Rudi for Thurman Munson.
On June 14, 1976, Finley was unable to make any trades. He had started contacting other teams about the possibility of selling his players' contracts. Joe Rudi, Vida Blue, Don Baylor, and Gene Tenace were worth $1 million each, while Sal Bando could be acquired for $500,000. Boston Red Sox General manager Dick O’Connell was in Oakland as the Red Sox would play the Athletics on June 15. Field manager Darrell Johnson had declared that he was interested in Joe Rudi and Rollie Fingers. The Red Sox had agreed to purchase both contracts for one million dollars each.
Dick O’Connell had contacted Detroit Tigers General manager Jim Campbell to purchase Vida Blue for one million dollars so that the New York Yankees could not get him.  Gabe Paul of the New York Yankees advised that he would pay $1.5 million for the opportunity to acquire Vida Blue. Finley offered Blue a three-year extension worth $485,000 per season to make the sale more attractive to the Yankees. With the extension, the Yankees agreed to purchase Blue.
Finley had then proceeded to contact Bill Veeck of the Chicago White Sox about purchasing Sal Bando. He then contacted the Texas Rangers, as they were interested in acquiring Don Baylor for the one million dollar asking price. Three days later, Bowie Kuhn voided the transactions in the "best interests of baseball." Amid the turmoil, the A's still finished second in the A.L. West, 2.5 games behind the Royals.

July–September
July 8 – At Wrigley Field, Randy Jones wins his 16th game of the year for the San Diego Padres, a National League record for wins at the All-Star break. He beats the Chicago Cubs 6–3. In the second half of the season, Jones will lose seven games by one run, two of them by 1–0 scores.
July 9 – In Montreal, the Houston Astros' Larry Dierker no-hits the host Montreal Expos, 6–0. He strikes out eight batters, including the first two in the ninth inning. Dierker had previously thrown two one-hitters.
July 13 – The National League emerges victorious in the annual All-Star Game by a score of 7–1. George Foster, one of seven Cincinnati Reds position players on the squad, hits a home run with three RBI, and is named the MVP. Rookie pitcher Mark Fidrych gives up two runs and takes the loss. It is the NL's 13th win over the American League in the last 14 games.
July 19 – Willie Davis of the San Diego Padres gets his 2500th hit versus the Chicago Cubs, a single in the 4th off of Bill Bonham at San Diego Stadium. The Padres won 3-2.
July 20 – Hank Aaron hits the 755th and last home run of his career, connecting off Dick Drago of the California Angels.  Aaron's record of 755 home runs would stand until the San Francisco Giants' Barry Bonds hit his 756th career home run against the Washington Nationals on August 7, 2007.
July 23 – In a game against the Taiyō Whales, Sadaharu Oh of the Yomiuri Giants hits his 700th home run, the first player in Nippon Professional Baseball to do so.
July 24 – In a 17-2 blowout of the Chicago White Sox, Lyman Bostock becomes the fourth Minnesota Twin to hit for the cycle.  Batting fourth for the first time ever, he goes four-for-four, with four RBI and four runs scored.
July 26 – Carl Yastrzemski of the Boston Red Sox gets his 2500th hit versus the Cleveland Indians, a double in the 1st off of Stan Thomas at Fenway Park. The Red Sox lost 9-4. Yastrzemski was beaten to the milestone one week earlier by his contemporary, Willie Davis on July 19. 
July 28 – Blue Moon Odom and Francisco Barrios combine on a no-hitter as the Chicago White Sox top the Oakland Athletics 2–1. For Odom, this is his last major league victory.
August 8 – The first game of today's Royals–White Sox double header at Comiskey Park sees the White Sox appear on the field in shorts.  The Sox return to long pants for the second game, after stealing five bases and defeating the Royals, 5-2.
August 9 – John Candelaria became the first Pirates pitcher in 69 years to throw a no-hitter in Pittsburgh by blanking the Los Angeles Dodgers 2-0. Candelaria's no-hitter came at Three Rivers Stadium. No Pirate ever threw a no-hitter at Forbes Field.
September 3 – At Shea Stadium, Tom Seaver fans Tommy Hutton of the Phillies in the 7th inning of the Mets 1-0 victory. Hutton is Seaver's 200th strikeout victim of the season – the 9th straight year the Mets' right-hander has reached that mark.
September 6 – Dodgers catcher Steve Yeager is seriously injured when the jagged end of a broken bat strikes him in the throat while he is waiting in the on-deck circle.
September 10 – California's Nolan Ryan strikes out 18 White Sox hitters in a 9-inning 3-2 victory at Chicago.
September 11 – Orestes "Minnie" Miñoso comes out of his twelve-year retirement.  Playing at home for the White Sox, he goes 0-for-3 against Frank Tanana.  The next day, he will single, becoming the oldest player to hit safely in a Major League game.
September 16 – Jose Morales of the Montreal Expos pinch-hits a three-run double in the seventh against the Chicago Cubs, giving him 25 pinch hits for the season, breaking the previous record of 24 by Dave Philley and Vic Davalillo.  The record would stand until John Vander Wal of the Colorado Rockies would collect 28 in 1995.
September 18 – Player-Manager Frank Robinson of the Cleveland Indians inserts himself into the lineup as a pinch hitter in the eight inning of a game against the Baltimore Orioles.  He singles in what will be his final at-bat as a player.  His influence as a manager and executive will continue for decades to come.
September 21 – In Los Angeles, the Cincinnati Reds clinch the National League West title with a 9-1 pasting of the Dodgers.
September 25 – The Yankees put an end to a 6-game losing streak with a 10-6 win over the Tigers to wrap up the Al East, the Yankees' first visit to the postseason since the 1964 World Series. Doyle Alexander gets the victory.
September 26 – In the last big league games at Montreal's Jarry Park, the Philadelphia Phillies beat the Montreal Expos 4-1 in the first game of a doubleheader to clinch the National League East title. Philly takes the nightcap, 2-1. Following the 2nd game, Dick Allen jumps the team in protest of the fact that veteran Tony Taylor is not listed on the post-season roster. Allen was fined by the Phillies and returned five days later, playing in two of the final three regular season games and the playoffs.
September 28 – The Dodgers' Walter Alston, after 23 seasons and 2,040 victories, steps down as manager. Third base coach Tommy Lasorda is promoted to the post.
September 29 – John Montefusco of the San Francisco Giants no-hits the Atlanta Braves 9-0 at Atlanta–Fulton County Stadium.

October–December
October 3:
George Brett edges Kansas City Royals teammate Hal McRae for the American League batting title, .333 to .332, when his blooper drops in front of Minnesota Twins outfielder Steve Brye and skips over his head for an inside-the-park home run. McRae believes the misplay is deliberate, and charges the Twins with racism.
The Chicago Cubs' Bill Madlock wrests the National League batting crown from Ken Griffey by collecting four singles in an 8-2 win over the Montreal Expos. The hits raise Madlock from .333 to .339, one point ahead of the idle Griffey, who belatedly joins the Reds 11-1 win over the Atlanta Braves and goes 0-for-2, dipping his average to .336.
Hank Aaron singles in his last major league at bat and drives in his 2,297th run as the sixth-place Milwaukee Brewers lose to the Detroit Tigers, 5-2.
October 6 – The Chicago White Sox release Minnie Minoso. 
October 7 – Judge Roy Hofheinz sells the Houston Astros to General Electric and Ford Motor Credit Companies.
October 11 – In the last of the eighth inning, leading the Hanshin Tigers 4-1 with two out and a full count, Sadaharu Oh hits his 715th home run to pass Babe Ruth's mark. He finishes the season with 716 HRs and takes aim at Hank Aaron's record.
October 14 – In Game 5 of the American League Championship Series, the New York Yankees take a 6-3 lead before Kansas City's George Brett connects for a 3-run home run in the top of the 8th inning. In the bottom of the 9th, New York's Chris Chambliss smashes the first pitch off Kansas City's Mark Littell over the right field fence for a 7-6 win, winning the Yankees their first AL pennant and World Series appearance since 1964.
October 17 – The first-ever weekend night game in World Series history took place in Cincinnati as the Reds defeated the New York Yankees, 4-3.
October 21 – In the World Series, the Cincinnati Reds beat the New York Yankees 7-2, completing a four-game sweep. Series MVP Johnny Bench has two home runs and five RBI in the Series, and demolishes the Yankees with .533 hitting. Opposing catcher Thurman Munson had six straight singles to tie a World Series mark. The Reds become the first team since the 1969 playoff expansion to go through an entire postseason without a defeat.  It is the last World Series to end in a sweep until 1989.
November 2 – San Diego Padres pitcher Randy Jones beats out Jerry Koosman of the New York Mets for the National League Cy Young Award. Jones led the league with 315 innings pitched and posted a 22-14 record for the fifth-place Padres.
November 5
New American League franchises in Seattle and Toronto fill up their rosters by selecting 30 players apiece from unprotected players on other AL rosters. Outfielder Ruppert Jones (Seattle) and infielder Bob Bailor (Toronto) are the first choices.
The Oakland A's trade manager Chuck Tanner, who'd just completed his first and only season in Oakland, to the Pittsburgh Pirates for catcher Manny Sanguillen. Sanguillen plays just one year in Oakland. He returns to Pittsburgh and is part of the 1979 World Series Champion Pittsburgh Pirates. The championship Pirates team is managed by Tanner. 
November 9 – The Oakland Athletics release Billy Williams, ending his career with 2,711 hits, 426 home runs, 1,475 RBI and a .290 average.
November 16 – New York Yankees catcher Thurman Munson wins the 1976 American League MVP Award, becoming the first Yankee to win the award since Elston Howard in 1963. Munson finished with a .302 average, 17 home runs and 105 RBI.
November 24 – Joe Morgan outdistances Cincinnati Reds teammate George Foster to win his second straight National League MVP Award. Morgan finished with a .320 average, 27 home runs, 111 RBI, 113 runs, 60 stolen bases, and led the NL in slugging percentage (.576) and OPS (1.020). Foster finished with 29 home runs and led the league with 121 RBI.
November 29 – Free agent Reggie Jackson signs with the New York Yankees for $3.5 million.
December 4 – Aurelio Rodríguez of the Detroit Tigers becomes the first American League third baseman since  to beat out Brooks Robinson for the Gold Glove Award. Other Newcomers on the TSN fielding team include third baseman Mike Schmidt, outfielder Dwight Evans and catcher Jim Sundberg, who would combine to win 24 awards.
December 6 – The Boston Red Sox trade Cecil Cooper to the Milwaukee Brewers for George Scott and Bernie Carbo.
December 9 – The Texas Rangers trade Jeff Burroughs to the Atlanta Braves for Adrian Devine, Ken Henderson, Dave May, Roger Moret, Carl Morton and an estimated $250,000.
December 14 – The San Diego Padres sign pitcher Rollie Fingers.

Movies
The Bad News Bears
The Bingo Long Traveling All-Stars & Motor Kings

Births

January
January 4 – Ted Lilly
January 5 – Kevin Witt
January 7 – Éric Gagné
January 7 – Alfonso Soriano
January 8 – Carl Pavano
January 10 – Jason Jiménez
January 10 – Adam Kennedy
January 14 – Pat Daneker
January 21 – Jason Ryan
January 21 – Ron Wright
January 22 – Jimmy Anderson
January 23 – Brandon Duckworth
January 28 – Rod Lindsey

February
February 1 – Phil Norton
February 3 – Bart Miadich
February 8 – Jim Parque
February 8 – Adam Piatt
February 10 – Lance Berkman
February 13 – Brian Rose
February 16 – Eric Byrnes
February 17 – Cody Ransom
February 17 – Scott Williamson
February 23 – Scott Elarton
February 24 – Randy Keisler
February 28 – Bobby Madritsch
February 29 – Terrence Long

March
March 1 – Ramón Castro
March 3 – Matt Treanor
March 4 – Hiram Bocachica
March 5 – Doug Clark
March 5 – Paul Konerko
March 8 – Juan Encarnación
March 8 – Ryan Freel
March 11 – Nate Teut
March 12 – Bryan Hebson
March 16 – Abraham Núñez
March 17 – Scott Downs
March 18 – Corky Miller
March 18 – Tomokazu Ohka
March 18 – Scott Podsednik
March 21 – Mike Darr
March 23 – Joel Peralta
March 24 – Joe Davenport
March 24 – Scott Wiggins
March 29 – Scott Atchison
March 29 – Kevin Nicholson

April
April 5 – Matt Blank
April 5 – Ryan Drese
April 5 – Ross Gload
April 6 – Alex Pelaez
April 9 – Kyle Peterson
April 9 – Óscar Robles
April 11 – Kelvim Escobar
April 12 – Jeff Wallace
April 14 – Kyle Farnsworth
April 14 – Paul Hoover
April 20 – Jason Roach
April 24 – John Barnes
April 26 – Scott Strickland
April 29 – Brandon Harper
April 29 – Erasmo Ramírez

May
May 4 – Robinson Cancel
May 4 – Ben Grieve
May 4 – Jason Michaels
May 5 – Keith Ginter
May 6 – Earl Snyder
May 9 – Jimmy Serrano
May 12 – Wes Helms
May 14 – Brian Lawrence
May 15 – Eric DuBose
May 15 – Jason Karnuth
May 15 – Tyler Walker
May 17 – José Guillén
May 18 – Roy Smith
May 19 – Chris Fussell
May 20 – Ramón Hernández
May 21 – Rocky Biddle
May 21 – Travis Harper
May 23 – Jake Robbins
May 24 – Carlos Febles
May 24 – Jason Grabowski
May 24 – Brandon Larson
May 25 – Lariel González
May 29 – Jerry Hairston Jr.

June
June 4 – Chang-Yong Lim
June 4 – J. C. Romero
June 7 – Esix Snead
June 8 – Kenji Johjima
June 9 – Justin Kaye
June 18 – Jeremy Powell
June 19 – Dustan Mohr
June 19 – Alex Prieto
June 20 – Carlos Lee
June 20 – Rob Mackowiak
June 27 – Johnny Estrada
June 27 – Chris Woodward

July
July 5 – Jay Spurgeon
July 12 – Dan Reichert
July 16 – Kory DeHaan
July 21 – Luis Saturria
July 24 – Nate Bump
July 25 – Javier Vázquez
July 26 – Brian Mazone
July 26 – Kevin Olsen
July 28 – Mike Estabrook

August
August 1 – Kevin Joseph
August 3 – Troy Glaus
August 4 – Kazuo Fukumori
August 4 – Scott Linebrink
August 5 – Bobby Kielty
August 6 – Kris Wilson
August 7 – Édgar Rentería
August 11 – Bubba Crosby
August 12 – Lew Ford
August 12 – Ismael Villegas
August 17 – Matt Anderson
August 17 – Mike Cervenak
August 17 – Yohanny Valera
August 18 – Brian Bowles
August 20 – Gene Kingsale
August 21 – Derrin Ebert 
August 21 – Ramón Vázquez
August 22 – Jeff Weaver
August 22 – Randy Wolf
August 23 – Mark DiFelice
August 23 – Cole Liniak
August 25 – Pedro Feliciano
August 25 – Mike Rose
August 26 – Geoff Geary
August 26 – Alex Sánchez
August 30 – Mike Koplove
August 30 – Brian Shackelford
August 31 – Jason Gilfillan

September
September 1 – Lance Davis
September 4 – Ron Calloway
September 4 – Brian Myrow
September 6 – Micheal Nakamura
September 7 – Aaron Looper
September 8 – Mike Rivera
September 11 – Edwards Guzmán
September 13 – Wade Miller
September 15 – Elvis Peña
September 15 – Matt Thornton
September 16 – Chad Harville
September 20 – Kevin Walker
September 21 – Pedro Santana
September 24 – Ben Broussard
September 25 – Juan Cerros
September 27 – Bo Hart
September 27 – Jason Phillips
September 29 – Jermaine Clark
September 29 – Calvin Pickering

October
October 2 – Víctor Santos
October 6 – Freddy García
October 10 – Pat Burrell
October 11 – Carl Sadler
October 13 – D. J. Reyburn
October 14 – Henry Mateo
October 17 – Seth Etherton
October 17 – Jason Jones
October 18 – Michael Tejera
October 19 – Jeff Austin
October 19 – Jason Shiell
October 19 – Michael Young
October 22 – Mike Colangelo
October 22 – Michael Barrett
October 23 – David Riske
October 27 – Simon Pond
October 30 – Dave Coggin

November
November 1 – Cleatus Davidson
November 2 – Sidney Ponson
November 4 – Kevin Frederick
November 5 – Alex Herrera
November 5 – Liu Rodríguez
November 7 – Les Walrond
November 8 – Víctor Álvarez
November 8 – Carlos Casimiro
November 11 – Jason Grilli
November 11 – Juan Melo
November 14 – Tim Hamulack
November 15 – Greg Jones
November 24 – Damian Moss
November 24 – Mike Edwards
November 26 – Brian Schneider
November 28 – Adam Bernero
November 30 – Craig Wilson

December
December 2 – Eddy Garabito
December 3 – Gary Glover
December 7 – Kevin Hooper
December 8 – Reed Johnson
December 8 – Rontrez Johnson
December 8 – José León
December 9 – Chris Booker
December 13 – Josh Fogg
December 15 – Aaron Miles
December 15 – Todd Tichenor
December 16 – Matt Kinney
December 17 – Edwin Almonte
December 17 – Jason Dellaero
December 17 – Eric Eckenstahler
December 19 – Jason Kershner
December 20 – Aubrey Huff
December 21 – Tony Cogan
December 22 – Jason Lane
December 22 – Wes Obermueller
December 23 – Brad Lidge
December 30 – A. J. Pierzynski
December 30 – Brad Voyles

Deaths

January
January 2 – Jack Kraus, 57, left-handed pitcher who appeared in 70 career games for the Philadelphia Phillies (1943 and 1945) and New York Giants (1946)
January 5 – Gene Elliott, 86, outfielder who played in five 1911 games for the New York Highlanders
January 5 – Ed Sperber, 80, outfielder/pinch-runner who appeared in six contests for the 1924–1925 Boston Braves
January 9 – Bert Johnson, 70, outfielder for four Negro leagues clubs between 1932 and 1938
January 16 – Chick Autry, 91, utility first baseman/outfielder in 81 career games for the Cincinnati Reds (1907 and 1909) and Boston Doves (1909)
January 17 – Ed Kinsella, 96, pitcher who appeared in 13 games as a member of the 1905 Pittsburgh Pirates and 1910 St. Louis Browns
January 19 – Otto Ray, 82, catcher who appeared for four Negro National League teams between 1920 and 1924
January 20 – Tom Dunn, 75, National League umpire from 1939 to 1946; home-plate umpire for 1943 All-Star Game, and worked 1944 World Series and 1,151 league games
January 29 – Harry Otis, 89, left-handed pitcher (nicknamed "Cannonball") who appeared in five games for the 1909 Cleveland Naps

February
February 9 – Ziggy Hasbrook, 82, first baseman who got into 11 games during stints with the 1916 and 1917 Chicago White Sox
February 10 – Eddie Moore, 77, infielder/outfielder who played in 748 games for Pittsburgh Pirates, Boston Braves, Brooklyn Robins, New York Giants and Cleveland Indians between 1923 and 1934; starting second baseman for 1925 World Series champion Pittsburgh
February 11 – Johnny Miljus, 80, pitcher who appeared in 127 games for the Pittsburgh Rebels (of the Federal League), Brooklyn Robins, Pittsburgh Pirates and Cleveland Indians between 1915 and 1929; appeared in two contests for the losing Pirates in 1927 World Series
February 16 – Eusebio González, 83, Cuban shortstop who played in three midseason games for the 1918 Boston Red Sox
February 16 – John Shovlin, 85, infielder who appeared in 18 total games for the 1911 Pittsburgh Pirates and the 1919–1920 St. Louis Browns
February 24 – Carey Selph, 74, infielder with St. Louis Cardinals (1929) and Chicago White Sox (1932) who appeared in 141 total games

March
March 1 – George "Rube" Foster, 88, pitcher in 138 games for the 1913–1917 Boston Red Sox; member of 1915 and 1916 world champions; in 1915, won 19 regular-season games and threw two complete-game victories against the Philadelphia Phillies in the World Series, including the clinching fifth game
March 6 – Emory Long, 63, infielder in the Negro leagues between 1932 and 1940
March 11 – Larry Gardner, 89, third baseman for the Boston Red Sox and Cleveland Indians (1908–1924) who was a member of four World Series championship teams (1912, 1915, 1916, 1920) and batted .300 or better five times; longtime coach at University of Vermont
March 13 – Johnny Pasek, 70, catcher who appeared in 32 career games for the 1933 Detroit Tigers and 1934 Chicago White Sox
March 17 – Bert Gallia, 84, pitcher in 242 career games for the 1912–1917 Washington Senators, 1918–1920 St. Louis Browns and 1920 Philadelphia Phillies; won 17 games in back-to-back years with the 1915–1916 Senators
March 18 – Paul Maloy, 83, pitcher in two midsummer contests for the 1913 Boston Red Sox
March 21 – Heinie Scheer, 75, second baseman who got into 120 games for 1922–1923 Philadelphia Athletics
March 23 – Walter Murphy, 65, pitcher for the 1931 Red Sox who appeared in two games

April
April 12 – John Mungin, 71, pitcher for the Baltimore Black Sox and Harrisburg Giants of the Eastern Colored League from 1925 to 1927
April 12 – Zollie Wright, 66, outfielder for four Negro National League clubs from 1935 to 1941; selected an All-Star in 1936 
April 13 – Mike McCormick, 58, outfielder with Cincinnati Reds (1940–1943, 1946), Boston Braves (1946–1948), Brooklyn Dodgers (1949), New York Giants (1950), Chicago White Sox (1950) and Washington Senators (1951) who appeared in 748 MLB games; played in three World Series (1940, 1948, 1949) and batted .310 in 29 at bats for Cincinnati's 1940 world champions
April 15 – Floyd Newkirk, 67, pitcher who threw one inning of scoreless relief for the New York Yankees in his only MLB game, on August 23, 1934
April 15 – George Scales, 75, second baseman and manager in the Negro leagues whose playing career spanned 20 years from 1921 to 1946; also a manager in the Puerto Rican winter league
April 17 – Clay Hopper, 73, Mississippi native and longtime minor-league player and manager between 1926 and 1956 who, as skipper of the 1946 Montreal Royals, was Jackie Robinson's manager when he broke the color line in "Organized Baseball"
April 22 – Ernie Krueger, 85, catcher who appeared in 318 career games for the Cleveland Naps (1913), New York Yankees (1915), New York Giants (1917), Brooklyn Robins (1917–1921) and Cincinnati Reds (1925); appeared in three games of the 1920 World Series
April 26 – Alex Ferguson, 79, pitcher who made 257 appearances for the New York Yankees, Boston Red Sox, Washington Senators, Philadelphia Phillies and Brooklyn Robins between 1918 and 1929; led American League in games lost (17) in 1924
April 27 – Ed Durham, 72, pitcher who worked in 143 games for the Red Sox and Chicago White Sox between 1929 and 1933
April 29 – Joe Berry, 81, second baseman in 15 games for the 1921–1922 New York Giants

May
May 1 – Luther McDonald, 70, right-hander who pitched for three Negro National League teams between 1927 and 1935; went 13–4 (4.28 ERA) for 1927 St. Louis Stars
May 2 – Dan Bankhead, 55, first black pitcher in modern National League history (1947, 1950–1951) as a Brooklyn Dodger; homered in first major league at-bat, August 26, 1947; posted 9–5 record with 6.52 ERA in 52 MLB games
May 3 – Ernie Nevers, 73, who excelled in several sports, including American football, basketball and baseball, where he was a right-handed pitcher who appeared in 44 games for the St. Louis Browns between 1926 and 1928
May 4 – Bob Cooney, 68, pitcher who got into 28 games for the Browns in 1931 and 1932
May 10 – Ken Trinkle, 56, pitcher for the New York Giants (1943 and 1946–1948) and Philadelphia Phillies (1949), who led the National League in games played by a pitcher in 1946 (48) and 1947 (62)
May 18 – Marion Fricano, 52, pitcher who appeared in 88 career games for the Philadelphia and Kansas City Athletics between 1952 and 1955; on September 26, 1954, as he nailed down a save in the Athletics' last regular-season game, he threw the final pitch in the 54-year history of the franchise in Philadelphia
May 25 – Al Lakeman, 57, reserve catcher/first baseman for the Cincinnati Reds (1942–1947), Philadelphia Phillies (1947–1948), Boston Braves (1949) and Detroit Tigers (1954); later a coach for the Boston Red Sox (1963–1964 and 1967–1969)
May 30 – Max Carey, 86, Hall of Fame center fielder, mainly with the Pittsburgh Pirates, who led NL in steals ten times, holding league career record of 738 until 1974; set NL records for career games, putouts, chances and double plays in outfield, and batted .458 in 1925 World Series; managed Brooklyn Dodgers in 1932 and 1933

June
June 3 – Paul Chervinko, 65, catcher who appeared in 42 games for the Dodgers in 1937 and 1938; later a minor league manager
June 3 – Dwight Stone, 89, pitcher for St. Louis of the American League and Kansas City of the Federal League in 1913–1914
June 5 – Otis Lambeth, 86, pitcher in 43 games for the Cleveland Indians between 1916 and 1918 
June 11 – Chet Covington, 65, left-handed pitcher who appeared in 19 games for the 1944 Philadelphia Phillies
June 11 – Jim Konstanty, 59, All-Star pitcher who became the first reliever to win the MVP award, with the 1950 "Whiz Kid" Phillies, when he won 16 games, all out of the bullpen, and saved 22 more to lead the National League, setting a new MLB record for games pitched (74); in 433 career games over 11 MLB seasons (1944–1946 and 1948–1956) with five clubs, posted a 66–48 (3.46) record with 76 saves
June 15 – Jimmy Dykes, 79, All-Star third baseman during a 22-year playing career (1918–1939) for the Philadelphia Athletics and Chicago White Sox, who went on to become the winningest manager (899 victories between May 9, 1934 and May 24, 1946) in White Sox history; succeeded Connie Mack as skipper of Athletics (1951–1953), and also managed Baltimore Orioles (1954), Cincinnati Redlegs (1958), Detroit Tigers (1959–1960) and Cleveland Indians (1960–1961)
June 16 – George Dickey, 60, catcher who appeared in 223 MLB games for the Boston Red Sox (1935–1936) and Chicago White Sox (1941–1942; 1946–1947); brother of Bill Dickey
June 19 – Henry "Prince" Oana, 66, pitcher, outfielder and native of Hawaii, who played in 30 games for the 1934 Philadelphia Phillies and 1943 and 1945 Detroit Tigers; batted .308 in 52 at bats, and went 3–2 (3.77) in 13 mound appearances
June 20 – Blix Donnelly, 62, pitcher who appeared in 190 games between 1944 and 1951 for the St. Louis Cardinals, Philadelphia Phillies and Boston Braves; member of 1944 World Series champion Cardinals
June 20 – Lou Klein, 57, infielder in 305 games for Cardinals (1943–1944, 1946 and 1949), Cleveland Indians (1951) and Philadelphia Athletics (1951) who spent the prime of his career (1946–1949) under suspension for "jumping" to the Mexican League; later a minor-league manager before becoming a member of the Chicago Cubs' "College of Coaches" (1961–1965); served as Cubs' head coach (manager) for parts of 1961, 1962 and 1965
June 23 – Lon Warneke, 67, five-time All-Star pitcher who had three 20-win seasons for the Cubs, led National League in victories and ERA in 1932, and won 192 games over 15 seasons for the Cubs and Cardinals; later an NL umpire for seven years (1949–1955)
June 30 – Firpo Marberry, 77, pitcher for the Washington Senators (1923–1932 and 1936), Detroit Tigers (1933–1935) and New York Giants (1936), who established single-season and career records for both saves and relief appearances; led majors in saves a record five times; also 94–52 as a starter; member of 1924 World Series champions

July
July 9 – Louis English, 74, catcher who wore the uniforms of Detroit, Nashville and Louisville of the Negro National League and Negro Southern League between 1929 and 1932
July 9 – Tom Yawkey, 73, owner and president of the Boston Red Sox from 1933 until his death, and vice president of the American League from 1956 to 1973; named to Hall of Fame by Veterans Committee in 1980
July 21 – Earle Combs, 77, Hall of Fame center fielder for the New York Yankees (1924–1935) who batted .325 lifetime and led the AL in triples three times; batting leadoff, he had eight seasons of 100 runs, and batted .350 over four World Series; won three championship rings as a player and six more as a Yankee coach (1935–1944)
July 24 – Sam Bankhead, 65, Former infielder/outfielder for several Negro League teams like the Birmingham Black Barons and Homestead Grays and older brother of Dan Bankhead
July 26 – Les Howe, 80, pitcher who appeared in 16 games for the 1923–1924 Boston Red Sox
July 29 – Elmer Myers, 82, pitcher for Philadelphia Athletics, Cleveland Indians and Boston Red Sox who worked in 185 games between 1915 and 1922
July 30 – Jack Knight, 81, pitcher who appeared in 72 games for three National League clubs, principally Philadelphia, in 1922 and from 1925 to 1927; longtime minor-league manager

August
August 3 – Homer Ezzell, 80, third baseman for the St. Louis Browns and Boston Red Sox between 1923 and 1925
August 15 – Jim Henry, 66, pitched from 1936 through 1939 for the Boston Red Sox and Philadelphia Phillies
August 15 – Dick Lajeskie, 50, second baseman who had a six-game audition with the New York Giants in September 1946
August 16 – George Aiton, 85, outfielder in ten games for the 1912 St. Louis Browns
August 17 – Bert Tooley, 89, shortstop for 1911–1912 Brooklyn Dodgers who appeared in 196 contests
August 19 – Johnny Walker, 79, first baseman who played 125 games for the 1919–1921 Philadelphia Athletics
August 27 – Bill Mizeur, 79, pinch hitter in two games for the 1923–1924 St. Louis Browns; minor-league outfielder who had a 14-year playing career
August 28 – Bill Hunnefield, 77, infielder in 511 MLB games for the Chicago White Sox (1926–1930), Cleveland Indians (1931), Boston Braves (1931) and New York Giants (1931)
August 29 – Al Platte, 86, longtime minor-league outfielder who appeared in eight MLB games for the 1913 Detroit Tigers

September
September 1 – Mike Meola, 70, pitcher for the Boston Red Sox and St. Louis Browns between 1933 and 1936, who was winless in 18 MLB games; posted a record of 20–5 with 2.90 ERA for the Pacific Coast League's Los Angeles Angels in 1934
September 4 – Monroe Mitchell, 74, pitcher who worked in ten games for the 1923 Washington Senators
September 5 – Jim O'Neill, 83, shortstop and second baseman for 1920 and 1923 Washington Senators; one of four brothers to play in the majors, including Steve O'Neill
September 6 – Vern Fear, 52, relief pitcher who appeared in four games for 1952 Chicago Cubs
September 10 – Blackie Carter, 73, outfielder who played in six games for the New York Giants from 1925 to 1926
September 20 – Luther Gilyard, 66, first baseman for Chicago, St. Louis and Birmingham of the Negro American League between 1937 and 1942
September 20 – John J. Quinn, 68, front-office executive who spent over 40 years in MLB; general manager of Boston/Milwaukee Braves (1945–1958) and Philadelphia Phillies (1959–1972); son and father of longtime baseball executives
September 25 – Red Faber, 88, Hall of Fame pitcher who played his entire 20-year career with the Chicago White Sox, winning 254 games and leading AL in ERA twice; his four 20-win seasons included a 25-win campaign for the scandal-decimated 1921 team, which finished 62-92
September 26 – Buddy Crump, 74, centerfielder who played one MLB game, on September 28, 1924, as a member of the New York Giants
September 26 – Rip Russell, 61, first- and third baseman who got into 425 career games for the Chicago Cubs (1939–1942) and Boston Red Sox (1946–1947)
September 28 – Linc Blakely, 64, outfielder who batted .225 in 102 at bats during his 34-game trial with the 1934 Cincinnati Reds

October
October 1 – Jelly Taylor, 66, three-time All-Star first baseman for the Cincinnati Tigers and Memphis Red Sox of the Negro American League between 1937 and 1946
October 2 – Walter Calhoun, 65, left-hander who pitched in the Negro leagues between 1932 and 1946; selected to 1940 All-Star team while a member of the St. Louis–New Orleans Stars
October 4 – Ollie Carnegie, 77, outfielder and minor-league slugger who excelled as a member of the Buffalo Bisons over a dozen seasons between 1931 and 1945; member of the International League Hall of Fame
October 5 – Bill Bagwell, 85, outfielder and pinch hitter who appeared in 92 games for the 1923 Boston Braves and 1925 Philadelphia Athletics
October 6 – Joe Erautt, 55, catcher in 32 games for the 1951–1952 Chicago White Sox
October 8 – John Bottarini, 68, catcher and 18-year veteran of minor leagues who appeared in 26 MLB games for 1937 Chicago Cubs
October 9 – Mark Christman, 62, third baseman and shortstop who appeared in 911 games for the Detroit Tigers, St. Louis Browns and Washington Senators between 1938 and 1949; starting third baseman for 1944 Browns, only St. Louis entry to win an American League pennant
October 9 – Bob Moose, 29, pitcher for the Pittsburgh Pirates from 1967–1976 who threw a no-hitter on September 20, 1969 against the pennant-bound New York Mets and led National League in winning percentage (14–3, .824) that season; posted a 76–71 career record in 289 career games; died in an automobile accident on his birthday
October 20 – Freddie Muller, 65, infielder who played in 17 career games for the 1933–1934 Boston Red Sox
October 25 – Claire Merritt Ruth, 79, widow of Babe Ruth, who died on August 16, 1948
October 26 – Eddie Silber, 62, outfielder for the 1937 and 1939 St. Louis Browns who played in 23 MLB games
October 29 – Harry Malmberg, 51, second baseman in 67 games for 1955 Detroit Tigers; coach for 1963–1964 Boston Red Sox; longtime minor league manager
October 29 – Andy Sarvis, 68, pitcher for the Cleveland Bears and Jacksonville Red Caps of the Negro American League between 1940 and 1942
October 31 – Charles Bernard "King" Lear, 85, Cincinnati Reds pitcher who fashioned a 7–12 record (3.02 ERA) in 57 games during the 1914 and 1915 seasons

November
November 2 – Regis Leheny, 68, left-handed pitcher for the 1932 Red Sox who worked in two games
November 2 – Dee Miles, 67, outfielder who appeared in 503 career games for the Washington Senators (1935–1936), Philadelphia Athletics (1939–1942) and Boston Red Sox (1943)
November 3 – Frank Brazill, 77, first baseman/third baseman in 72 total games for the 1921–1922 Athletics
November 9 – Bud Culloton, 80, pitcher who hurled in 13 games for the 1925 and 1926 Pittsburgh Pirates
November 11 – Ken Crawford, 82, first baseman for the 1915 Baltimore Terrapins of the "outlaw" Federal League
November 11 – Jimmy O'Connell, 75, reserve outfielder for 1923–1924 National League champion New York Giants; suspended for life by Commissioner Kenesaw Mountain Landis after he was implicated in an unsuccessful scheme to bribe a Philadelphia player to deliberately lose the final games of the 1924 season
November 14 – Fred Baczewski, 50, left-hander who went 17–10 (4.45 ERA) in 63 games for the Chicago Cubs and Cincinnati Redlegs from 1953–1956; placed sixth in 1953 NL Rookie of the Year balloting
November 19 – Frank Kellert, 52, first baseman for the St. Louis Browns, Baltimore Orioles, Brooklyn Dodgers and Chicago Cubs, getting into 122 career games from 1953 to 1956; member of Brooklyn's 1955 world champions
November 20 – Les Hennessy, 82, second baseman who played 14 games for the 1913 Detroit Tigers
November 25 – John André, 53, four-time 20-game-winning pitcher in the minors who received a 22-game trial with the 1955 Cubs
November 27 – Al Baird, 81, infielder who appeared in 48 total games for the 1917 and 1919 New York Giants

December
December 1 – George Earnshaw, 76, pitcher who had three 20-win seasons for 1929–1930–1931 AL champion Philadelphia Athletics; later a scout and coach
December 2 – Danny Murtaugh, 59, manager who over 15 seasons and four stints with the Pittsburgh Pirates won two World Series (1960, 1971) and three NL East titles between August 1957 and his October 1976 retirement; former second baseman for Pirates, Philadelphia Phillies and Boston Braves who appeared in 767 total games; led NL in stolen bases as rookie in 1941
December 3 – Leo Townsend, 85, left-handed pitcher who worked in eight games for the Boston Braves in 1920 and 1921
December 6 – Jonathan "Mandy" Brooks, 79, outfielder who played 116 games for the 1925–1926 Chicago Cubs
December 7 – Duke Maas, 47, pitcher who won 45 games for the Detroit Tigers, Kansas City Athletics and New York Yankees between 1955 and 1961
December 9 – Wes Ferrell, 68, All-Star pitcher who had six 20-win seasons for the Cleveland Indians and Boston Red Sox, with 193 career wins, including a no-hitter; batted .280 in 1,176 at bats, with 38 homers among his 329 hits over his 15-year MLB career (1927–1941), and caught by brother Rick for five seasons; also played for the Washington Senators, New York Yankees, Brooklyn Dodgers and Boston Braves
December 9 – Annie Gosbee, 40, All-American Girls Professional Baseball League infielder
December 9 – Red Haley, 75, lefty-swinging infielder who played for the Chicago American Giants and Birmingham Black Barons of the Negro National League in 1928 and the barnstorming Kansas City Monarchs in 1933
December 10 – Vic Keen, 77, pitcher for 1981 Philadelphia Athletics, 1921–1925 Chicago Cubs and 1926–1927 St. Louis Cardinals; member of 1926 World Series champions 
December 10 – Danny Thompson, 29, infielder with the Minnesota Twins (1970–1976) and Texas Rangers (1976), who played four seasons after being diagnosed with leukemia; he appeared in his last game on October 2, 1976 (as a pinch hitter), and died two months and one week later
December 10 – Luis Tiant Sr., 70, Cuban-born southpaw and father of the star pitcher of the 1960s and 1970s; three-time All-Star hurler as a member of the New York Cubans of the Negro National League whose playing career encompassed 20 years (1928–1947) in the Cuban and Dominican winter leagues, Negro leagues, and Mexican League
December 18 – Ned Harris, 60, outfielder for the Detroit Tigers (1941–1943, 1946) who appeared in 262 career games
December 25 – Bill Skiff, 81, ex-catcher who followed his 22-game MLB playing career with 1921 Pittsburgh Pirates and 1926 New York Yankees with a long tenure as a minor league player and manager, then as a scout for the Yankees' organization
December 26 – Walt Lynch, 79, catcher in three contests for the 1922 Boston Red Sox
December 27 – Press Cruthers, 86, Philadelphia Athletics second baseman who appeared in seven games in 1913 and 1914, who later managed in the All-American Girls Professional Baseball League

References